Jarkko Niemi can refer to:

 Jarkko Niemi (actor) (born 1984), a Finnish actor
 Jarkko Niemi (cyclist) (born 1982), a Finnish cyclist